Philipp Strauch can refer to:

Philipp Strauch (scholar) (1852-1934), German medieval scholar
Philipp Strauch (sailor) (1862-1924), Russian Olympic sailor